Sylheti Nagri or Sylheti Nagari (ISO:), known in classical manuscripts as Sylhet Nagri (Sileṭ Nagri) amongst many other names (see below), was an Indic script of the Brahmic family. The script was historically used in areas of Bengal and Assam that were east of the Padma, primarily in the eastern part of the Sylhet region, to document Muslim religious poetry known as puthis; having no presence in formal documentations. In the course of the 20th century, it has lost much ground to the standardised Eastern Nagari script. Printing presses for Sylheti Nagri existed as late as into the 1970s, and in the 2000s, a Unicode font was created for the script.

Etymology and names 
Sylhet Nagri is a compound of "Sylhet" and "nāgrī". Sylhet is the name of the region in which the script was primarily used and originated from. Nagri means "of or pertaining to an abode (nagar)". Hence, Sylhet Nagri denotes from the abode or city of Sylhet. In recent times, it has come to be known as Sylheti Nagri although this name was not used in the classical manuscripts such as Pohela Kitab by Muhammad Abdul Latif. Nagendranath Basu asserts that Nagri is named after the Nagar Brahmins who were known for retaining their Nagri scripts whilst adopting the local language of places which they migrated to.

The script has been known by other names such as Jalalabadi Nagri after the name of Jalalabad (Sylhet), Phul Nagri, Jangli Nagri and Kat Nagri, amongst others. Another popular term is Musalmani Nagri due to its prevalence amongst Muslims of eastern Bengal.

History

Origins
According to Qadir (1999) and Professor Clifford Wright, the script descends from Kaithi script, a script predominantly used in Bihar.

The specific origin of the script is debated. Though most popular in Sylhet, the script was historically also used in Greater Mymensingh, Northeast India and West Bengal. One hypothesis is that the Muslims of Sylhet were the ones to invent it for the purpose of mass Islamic education, which is thought to have taken place during the 15th-century, when Bengali Hindus led by Krishna Chaitanya, started a Sanskrit and Vaishnavist reawakening movement. On the other hand, Ahmad Hasan Dani believes that it was invented by the Afghans during their rule of Bengal, since Nagri letters resemble Afghan coin symbols and the large number of Afghan inhabitants in Sylhet at the time. Another theory dates the script's origin as late as the seventeenth—eighteenth century; claiming that it was invented to facilitate the Muslim sepoys coming from the joint state of Bihar and other immigrant Muslims.

Though almost solely used by Muslims, there are other theories which point the script's origins to Buddhists and Hindus who later converted to Islam. A popular theory is that it was brought to the region via Nagar Brahmins. This is a Hindu caste known for travelling and settling across the subcontinent, adopting the local language but writing in their own Nagari-variant of Kaithi instead. The Brahmins converted to Islam though retained the practice of the Nagri script for poetry. This is also the case in other parts of South Asia such as Sindh, Multan and Varanasi. Baitali Kaithi was a former script used to write Hindustani at a similar time, and it was identical to Sylhet Nagri with the exception that the latter had a matra (upper horizontal line used in Brahmic scripts). Others say that the script was invented by immigrant Bhikkhus (originally Buddhist in faith) from neighbouring countries such as Nepal.

Manuscripts have been found of works such as Rag Namah by Fazil Nasim Muhammad, Shonabhaner Puthi by Abdul Karim and the earliest known work Talib Husan (1549) by Ghulam Husan.

Transcription
Bengali Muslim poetry was written in a colloquial dialect of Middle  Bengali known as Dobhashi, which had a highly Persian and Hindustani lexicon. The literature of Sylheti Nagri was written in a similar style, however is distinguished with its phonology and some vocabulary being strongly influenced by Sylheti.

Usage
The simplistic nature of the script inspired a lot of poets, though the bulk of Sylheti Nagri literature was born in the late 19th century. Abdul Karim, a munshi who was studying and completing his education in London, spent several years in the English capital to learn the printing trade. After returning home in circa 1869, he designed a woodblock type for the script and founded the Islamia Printing Press in Bandar Bazar, Sylhet. Padmanath Bhattacharjee Vidyabinod, who wrote the first scholarly article on the script, is of the opinion that Abdul Karim's standardisation marks the start of the script's reawakening (nobojonmo) period. Prior to Abdul Karim's intervention, not much is known about the popularity and usage of the script. The manuscripts were of prosaic quality, but poetry was also abundant.

Other Sylheti Nagri presses were established in Sylhet, Sunamganj, Shillong and Kolkata. Some include the Sarada Printing and Publishing in Naiyorpul, Sylhet; and Calcutta's General Printing Works in 16 Gardner Lane, Taltala as well as the Hamidi Press in Sealdah. It has been asserted from scholarly writings that the script was used as far as Bankura, Barisal, Chittagong and Noakhali. From the description of Shreepadmanath Debsharma:
 The script is thought to have spread to Chittagong and Barisal via river.

Although the script vastly extended across Bengal, its use "was restricted to a certain class of Muslims", in particular the Muslim women.

The Munshi Sadeq Ali is considered to have been the greatest and most popular writer of the script. The script has also been used in the daily lives of the inhabitants of Sylhet apart from using in religious literature. Letters, receipts, and even official records has been written using this script. Apart from renowned literary works such as Halat-un-Nabi, Jongonama, Mahabbatnama or Noor Noshihot, it has been used to write medicine and magical manuscripts, as well as Poems of the Second World War. As late as the 1930s, Nagendranath Basu noticed that the Bengali Muslims of Bishnupur, Bankura were using the Bengali alphabet for all purposes, but the Nagri script for puthis.

The script, never having been a part of any formal education, reached the common people with seeming ease. Although it was hardly used in comparison to the Bengali script, it was common for lower-class Muslims in eastern Sylhet to sign their names in this script. Many Sylheti Nagri presses fell out of use during the Bangladeshi Liberation War and Indo-Pakistani War of 1971, including Islamia Press in Sylhet town which was destroyed by a fire.

Modern history

Many Sylheti Nagri presses fell out of use during the Bangladeshi Liberation War and Indo-Pakistani War of 1971, including Islamia Press in Sylhet town which was destroyed by a fire. It gradually became very unpopular the script is used mainly by linguists and academics. Research on the script multiplied to its greatest extent in post-colonial Pakistan and independent Bangladesh. In the late 20th century, Munshi Ashraf Hussain, a researcher of Bengali folk literature, contributed immensely to Sylheti Nagri research.

In 2009, the publication of literature in the Nagri script recommenced in Bangladesh through the efforts of Mostafa Selim, who founded a publishing company called Utsho Prokashon based in Dhaka, and Anwar Rashid's New Nation Library in Puran Lane, Sylhet. By 2014, a collection of 25 manuscripts, known as Nagri Grantha Sambhar, was published by Utsho Prokashon's Muhammad Abdul Mannan and Selim. The recent revivals sparked a great interest in the country, and achieved significant coverage in national newspapers, TV and radio channels across Bangladesh. The government enabled free circulation of books about Nagri to be distributed to schools and colleges in Sylhet. A documentary directed by Sarwar Tamizuddin, titled Nagri Lipir Nabajatra, was aired across the country.  The Bangla Academy, an institution funded by the Government of Bangladesh to serve as the official body regarding the Bengali language, has begun hosting Nagri bookstalls at the Ekushey Book Fair. In 2014, a Nagri press conference was held at the Pathak Shamabesh Center in Shahbag, a major neighbourhood located in Bangladesh's capital, Dhaka. The Sylhet City Corporation and Sylhet District Council funded the establishment of a £20,000 circular mural at Surma Point known as the Nagri Chattar in 2018, which was designed by Shubhajit Chowdhury. The official building of Sylhet District's Deputy Commissioner has also installed Nagri signboards.

In the United Kingdom, the New Testament was successfully transcribed into Sylheti Nagri by James Lloyd Williams and others on 2014 Christmas Day and titled Pobitro Injil Shorif.

Letters

The Sylheti Nagri script can be divided into vowels and vowel diacritics/marks, consonants and consonant conjuncts, diacritical and punctuation marks. Vowels & consonants are used as alphabet and also as diacritical marks. The script is characterised by its simplistic glyph, with fewer letters than Bengali. The total number of letters is 32; there are 5 vowels and 28 consonants.

Vowels
The widely accepted number of vowels is 5, although some texts show additional vowels. For example, the diphthong ôi has sometimes been regarded as an additional vowel. The vowels don't follow the sequence of Bengali alphabet. The vowels also have their own respective diacritics known as "horkot".
 ""  sounds as the default inherent vowel for the entire script.
 When a vowel sound occurs syllable-initially or when it follows another vowel, it is written using a distinct letter. When a vowel sound follows a consonant (or a consonant cluster), it is written with a diacritic which, depending on the vowel, can appear above, below, before or after the consonant. These vowel marks cannot appear without a consonant and are called  horkot.
 An exception to the above system is the vowel , which has no vowel mark but is considered inherent in every consonant letter. To denote the absence of the inherent vowel  following a consonant, a diacritic called the  oshonto may be written underneath the consonant.
 Although there is only one diphthong in the inventory of the script: "" oi , its phonetic system has, in fact, many diphthongs.

Vowel diacritics

Consonants
There are 27 consonants. The names of the letters are typically just the consonant sound with the inherent vowel  . Since the inherent vowel is assumed and not written, most letters' names look identical to the letter itself, i.e. the name of the letter  is ghô.

There is a difference between the pronunciation of  rô and  ṛo.

Symbols

Sample texts
The following is a sample text in Sylheti of Article 1 of the Universal Declaration of Human Rights by the United Nations:

Sylheti in Sylheti Nagari script
ꠗꠣꠞꠣ ১: ꠢꠇꠟ ꠝꠣꠘꠥꠡ ꠡꠣꠗꠤꠘꠜꠣꠛꠦ ꠢꠝꠣꠘ ꠁꠎ꠆ꠎꠔ ꠀꠞ ꠢꠇ ꠟꠁꠀ ꠙꠄꠖꠣ ‘ꠅꠄ। ꠔꠣꠁꠘꠔꠣꠁꠘꠞ ꠛꠤꠛꠦꠇ ꠀꠞ ꠀꠇꠟ ꠀꠍꠦ। ꠅꠔꠣꠞ ꠟꠣꠉꠤ ꠢꠇꠟꠞ ꠄꠇꠎꠘꠦ ꠀꠞꠇꠎꠘꠞ ꠟꠉꠦ ꠛꠤꠞꠣꠖꠞꠤꠞ ꠝꠘ ꠟꠁꠀ ꠀꠌꠞꠘ ꠇꠞꠣ ꠃꠌꠤꠔ।
Sylheti in phonetic Romanization
Dara ex: Hoxol manuṣ ṣadínbábe homan ijjot ar hox loia foeda óe. Taintainor bibex ar axol asé. Otar lagi hoxlor exzone aroxzonor loge biradorir mon loia asoron xora usit.
Sylheti in IPA

Gloss
Clause 1: All human free-manner-in equal dignity and right taken birth-take do. Their reason and intelligence exist; therefore everyone-indeed one another's towards biradri attitude taken conduct do should.
Translation
Article 1: All human beings are born free and equal in dignity and rights. They are endowed with reason and conscience. Therefore, they should act towards one another in a spirit of brotherhood.

Fonts and keyboards 

In 1997, Sue Lloyd-Williams of STAR produced the first computer font for script. The New Surma is a proprietary font. Noto fonts provides an open source font for the script. Syloti Nagri was added to the Unicode Standard in March 2005 with the release of version 4.1, and is available on Apple devices. Other fonts include Mukter Ahmed's Fonty 18.ttf, developed from manuscripts to include traditional Sylheti numbers. As a routine project of the Metropolitan University, Sylhet, Sabbir Ahmed Shawon and Muhammad Nurul Islam (under the name CapsuleStudio) developed and launched the Syloti Nagri Keyboard, also for Google Play, on 9 December 2017. Different keyboards and fonts are available now:
 Syloti Nagri Notes, by the UK-based Sureware Ltd on Google Play.
 Multiling O Keyboard, with additional app Sylheti Keyboard plugin by Honso, on Google Play.
 Google's GBoard has also made Sylheti (Syloti Nagri) available as an input from April 2019.

Unicode

Syloti Nagri was added to the Unicode Standard in March 2005 with the release of version 4.1.

The Unicode block for Syloti Nagri, is U+A800–U+A82F:

See also
 List of works written in Sylheti Nagri
 Ashraf Hussain, researcher of the script
 Sadeq Ali, popular writer of the script
 History of Sylhet
 Sylhet region
 Puthi

Gallery

References

External links 

 Omniglot
 Sylheti Translation and Research
 British Library archive 
 Jadavpur University archive
 Proposal to Encode Syloti Nagri Numerals

Brahmic scripts
Writing systems of Asia
Sylheti language